The Saint Francis Xavier Mission, in Lewis County, Washington three miles north of present-day Toledo, Washington, was the first Catholic mission in what is now the U.S. state of Washington and is now the oldest Catholic church in the state. The first Mass (liturgy) was offered there December 16, 1838,  by François Norbert Blanchet, who co-founded the mission with Modeste Demers, Although that is considered the founding date, the mission cemetery predates the mission as such, having been started by the Hudson's Bay Company approximately in 1831. The mission, which originally occupied 640 acres of Cowlitz Prairie, is also known as the Cowlitz Mission and, especially by members of the Cowlitz Indian Tribe, as Saint Mary's after a girl's boarding school that operated there from 1911 to 1973.

Here and elsewhere, Blanchet used a visual device known as the "Catholic Ladder" as a means of instruction about the history of Christianity and the Catholic Church. There is a wooden reproduction of the Catholic ladder as part of the present-day mission.

There have been a series of buildings on the site. The first chapel was a log building erected no later than July 1839. It was replaced by a larger church in 1879. That was destroyed by fire in 1901, resulting in the loss of the parish records as well as the death of a priest, Father Van Holdebeke, who died of injuries sustained trying to salvage those records. A rebuilt church was destroyed by fire in 1916; a new brick church was built in 1917, but its interior burned in 1932; the present-day church is a rebuilt version of that brick church. There have also been several church halls, friaries, rectories etc. over the years.

The Sisters of Providence operated a convent and the Providence of Our Lady of the Sacred Heart School from November 13, 1876, through the school year of 1897–1898, teaching both boys and girls, separately from one another. Most of their students were French Canadian Catholics. The school failed financially owing in part to the Depression of 1893 and the increased availability of public schools in nearby towns.
Later, Franciscan friars served at the mission from 1908 to 1996, and Franciscan Sisters (Sisters of St. Francis of Penance and Charity) operated a boarding school for girls, St. Mary's Academy, 1911 to 1973; the buildings for this school are distinct from those of the old Sisters of Providence school. The former St. Mary's buildings are now owned by Cowlitz Tribal Housing, associated with the Cowlitz Indian Tribe.
One of the largest changes that has impacted the Church of Saint Francis Xavier since the departure of the Franscscian Friars is the lack of clergy. The parish, once the hub of several other South West Washington missions has been reduced to one. Its former parishes included Sacred Heart, Winlock (closed 2016), Sacred Heart, Morton (closed 2018), Saint Agnes, Napavine (closed 1980), Our Lady of the Assumption, St. Urban (Closed 1965). The Church of Saint Yves, Mossyrock, and the church of Saint Mary, Keslo are all that remain from the once large mission. Since 2009 the former St. Mary's has served as senior housing for the tribe.

See also
 Fort Cowlitz

Notes

External links
 Saint Francis Xavier Mission Cemetery, Lewis County, WA, US GenWeb Archives

Roman Catholic churches in Washington (state)
Lewis County, Washington
Roman Catholic Archdiocese of Seattle
Christian missions in North America
Catholic missions
Buildings and structures in Washington (state)
History of Washington (state)
Washington Territory
Oregon Territory
1838 establishments in Oregon Country
Religious organizations established in 1838
Roman Catholic churches completed in 1932
19th century in Washington (state)
Franciscan churches in the United States
Christian schools in Washington (state)
Boarding schools in Washington (state)
Cemeteries in Washington (state)
Residential buildings in Washington (state)
20th-century Roman Catholic church buildings in the United States